James Odongo (27 March 19314 December 2020) was a Ugandan Roman Catholic prelate who served as bishop of the Roman Catholic Archdiocese of Tororo in Uganda, from 5 January 1985, until his retirement on 27 June 2007. He had also served as Auxiliary Bishop of Tororo, Uganda from 25 November 1964 until 19 August 1968, and as Archbishop of Tororo Archdiocese from 2 January 1999 until 27 June 2007.

Background and priesthood
Odongo was born in the village of Molo, in present-day Tororo District, in the Eastern Region of Uganda. His twin sibling, Father Alfred Opio, predeceased him. He was ordained priest on 22 December 1956 and served as priest in the Diocese of Tororo until 25 November 1964.

As bishop
Odongo was appointed by Pope Paul VI as the ordinated titular bishop of Bahanna on 25 November 1964 and auxiliary bishop of Tororo. He was consecrated as bishop on 16 February 1965 by Cardinal Laurean Rugambwa†, Bishop of Roman Catholic Diocese of Bukoba, assisted by Bishop John Francis Greif, MHM†, Bishop of Tororo and Vincent Joseph McCauley, Congregation of Holy Cross†, Bishop of the Roman Catholic Diocese of Fort Portal.

On 19 August 1968, he was appointed as Bishop of the Roman Catholic Diocese of Tororo. On 5 January 1985, Pope John Paul II appointed him to concurrently serve as the bishop of the Military Ordinate of Uganda. As of July 2019, he was the incumbent diocesan Ordinary of that diocese.

On 2 January 1999, Odongo became the first Archbishop of the Roman Catholic Archdiocese of Tororo. He retired from that position on 27 June 2007, thus becoming Archbishop Emeritus of Tororo, Uganda. As of January 2017, following the death of Right Reverend Colin Cameron Davis, Bishop Emeritus of Ngong Diocese, in Kenya, Archbishop Odongo became the last surviving representative of AMECEA Region at the Vatican II Council, which was held between 1962 and 1965.

Retirement and death
Following his retirement in 2007, Bishop Emeritus Odongo settled in the city of Mbale. For the two weeks before his death, he was hospitalised at St. Francis Hospital Nsambya. He died there on the morning of 4 December 2020.

See also
 Roman Catholicism in Uganda
 Uganda Martyrs

Succession table as Archbishop of Military Ordinariate of Uganda

References

External links
Profile of Military Ordinariate of Uganda 
Profile of Roman Catholic Archdiocese of Tororo 

1931 births
2020 deaths
People from Tororo District
20th-century Roman Catholic bishops in Uganda
21st-century Roman Catholic archbishops in Uganda
Roman Catholic archbishops of Tororo